In music, Op. 130 stands for Opus number 130. Compositions that are assigned this number include:

 Beethoven – String Quartet No. 13
 Jongen – Mass
 Schumann – Children's Ball (Kinderball) (four hands)